Sharina van Dort (born 18 October 1988) is a Dutch team handball player. She used to play for the club SV Dalfsen, and on the Dutch national team. She represented the Netherlands at the 2013 World Women's Handball Championship in Serbia.

References

External links

1988 births
Living people
Dutch female handball players
Sportspeople from Zwolle
21st-century Dutch women